Firsilla (Farsillah) is a village in Derna District in northeastern Libya.  The village located on the east side of the Akhdar Mountains. The village of Firsilla formed around a spring of the same name.

Prior to the 2007 reorganization, Firsilla was part of Al Qubah District.

Notes

Populated places in Derna District
Jebel Akhdar (Libya)
Cyrenaica